Ignition Entertainment Limited, doing business as UTV Ignition Games, was a video game publisher of Indian media conglomerate UTV Software Communications. After The Walt Disney Company acquired UTV Software Communications as a wholly owned subsidiary for The Walt Disney Company India, UTV Ignition Games assets were liquidated.

History 
UTV Ignition Games originated as a British video game publisher in September 2001 called Valecombe Limited and was located in Waltham Abbey. The company was renamed Ignition Entertainment on 30 March 2002. It was created from a selection of smaller developers and publishers, such as Archer Maclean's Awesome Studios. In 2007, the company was acquired by UTV Software Communications and opened two new branches: Ignition Tokyo in Japan and Ignition Florida in the United States.

Focused on the production of games for the PlayStation Portable and Nintendo DS, the company has produced a selection of budget titles for the Game Boy Advance: Pool Paradise from Awesome Studios as well as the Nintendo DS game Zoo Keeper. The company also published SNK's full lineup in Europe which includes the Metal Slug series, Samurai Shodown series as well as The King of Fighters series. In 2005, the company had several games planned, including Mercury, The King of Fighters Neowave and Pool Paradise International. The company had acquired the rights to the tactical role-playing game Spectral Force Genesis. The game was released later that year in North America and Europe.

On 20 April 2007, the company announced the completion of their acquisition by UTV Software Communications, a media conglomerate based in India. On 17 December 2007, they announced the opening of two development studios – Ignition Florida, and Ignition Tokyo. Both studios were said to be working on proprietary intellectual property for next-generation platforms. The Tokyo studio was composed of former members of Clover Studio and Capcom, worked on the game El Shaddai: Ascension of the Metatron. On 21 April 2009, Ignition announced that they would be publishing Muramasa: The Demon Blade for the Wii in North America. On 22 October, they announced they would be publishing Arc Rise Fantasia. Ignition Entertainment also published The King of Fighters XII in North America and Europe for Xbox 360 and PlayStation 3 during Summer 2009.

On 2 November 2010, sources at UTV confirmed the closing of the Florida-based studio. Staff were given opportunities to relocate to Texas or find other work. This announcement followed the widespread allegations of sexual harassment by former boss Paul Steed and mismanagement of company funds. The title they were producing, Reich, had completed 2 of 9 major levels' costing roughly US$23 million. Despite major setbacks, the London office continued on in a more limited scope. Leaked footage of Reich was uploaded to YouTube in November 2010 by an unknown source.

Games published

References 

Defunct video game companies of the United Kingdom
Video game companies established in 2002
Video game companies disestablished in 2012
Video game publishers
2002 establishments in the United Kingdom
Defunct companies based in London
The Walt Disney Company subsidiaries
UTV Software Communications